Saber Mohammadzadeh was an Iranian communist politician.

In 1966, he was arrested by the government and the Pahlavi dynasty courts sentenced him to death.

Due to protests from international communist parties, the sentence was reduced to life imprisonment.

After the Iranian Revolution, he ran for an Assembly of Experts for Constitution seat from Tehran constituency.

Mohammadzadeh was a victim of the 1988 executions of Iranian political prisoners.

References 

1988 deaths
Tudeh Party of Iran politicians
20th-century executions by Iran
Iranian people convicted of spying for the Soviet Union
Executed communists